Oenology (also enology) is the science and study of wine and winemaking. Oenology is distinct from viticulture, which is the science of the growing, cultivation, and harvesting of grapes. The English word oenology derives from the Greek word oinos (οἶνος) "wine" and the suffix –logia (-λογία) the "study of". An oenologist is an expert in the science of wine and of the arts and techniques for making wine.

Education and training
University programs in oenology and viticulture usually feature a concentration in science for the degree of Bachelor of Science (B.S, B.Sc., Sc.B), and as a terminal master's degree — either in a scientific or in a research program for the degree of Master of Science (M.S., Sc.M.), e.g. the master of professional studies degree. Oenologists and viticulturalists with doctorates often have a background in horticulture, plant physiology, and microbiology.
Related to oenology are the professional titles of sommelier and master of wine, which are specific certifications in the restaurant business and in hospitality management. Occupationally, oenologists usually work as winemakers, as wine chemists in commercial laboratories, and in oenologic organisations, such as the Australian Wine Research Institute.

Australia
Schools in Australia tend to offer a "bachelor of viticulture" or "master of viticulture" degree.

 Charles Sturt University - Wagga Wagga, New South Wales
 Curtin University of Technology - Perth, Western Australia
 Melbourne Polytechnic/La Trobe University - Melbourne Australia
 Queensland College of Wine Tourism - Stanthorpe, Queensland
 University of Adelaide - Adelaide, South Australia

Brazil
 Federal Institute of Rio Grande do Sul - Bento Gonçalves, Porto Alegre, Feliz, Sertão, Canoas, Porto Alegre-Restinga, Caxias do Sul, Osório, Erechim, and Rio Grande
Federal University of Pampa - Dom Pedrito Campus, Rio Grande do Sul

Canada
 Brock University - St. Catharines, Ontario

France
Official National Diploma of Oenology:
 Institut National Polytechnique de Toulouse - Toulouse
 Jules Guyot Institute - Dijon
 University of Bordeaux - Bordeaux
 University of Montpellier I - Montpellier
 University of Reims - Reims

Other wine diplomas:
 Université de Bourgogne - Dijon
 Université du Vin - Suze-la-Rousse

Germany
 Hochschule Geisenheim University - Geisenheim

Israel
 The Hebrew University of Jerusalem - Rehovot

Italy
 Università Cattolica del Sacro Cuore  - International Vintage Master - Piacenza 
 University of Bologna - Cesena
 University of Padua - Conegliano
 University of Palermo - Marsala
 University of Perugia - Perugia
 University of Salento - Lecce
 University of Trento - Edmund Mach Foundation - Trento, San Michele all'Adige 
 University of Turin - Grugliasco, Alba, and Asti (as a Consortium of the Universities of Turin, Milan, Palermo, Sassari, and Foggia)
 University of Udine - Udine
 University of Verona - Verona

New Zealand
 Eastern Institute of Technology - Hawke's Bay
 Lincoln University - Christchurch
 University of Auckland- Auckland

Peru
 Universidad Privada San Juan Bautista - Ingeniería en Enología y Viticultura - Lima, Ica, Chincha

Portugal
Universidade do Porto - Porto
University of Trás-os-Montes and Alto Douro  - Vila Real
Universidade de Évora - Évora

South Africa
 University of Stellenbosch - Stellenbosch

Slovenia
University of Nova Gorica - School for viticulture and enology - Vipava

Switzerland
 Changins - Nyon

Spain
 Universitat Rovira i Virgili - Tarragona
 Universidad de La Rioja - La Rioja
Universidad de Cádiz - Cádiz, Andalusia

Ukraine
 National University of Life and Environmental Sciences of Ukraine - Kyiv
 National University of Food Technologies - Kyiv
 Odessa National Academy of Food Technologies - Odessa

United Kingdom
 Plumpton College - East Sussex

United States
 Allan Hancock College - Santa Maria, California
 California Polytechnic State University - San Luis Obispo, California
 Colorado State University - Fort Collins, Colorado
 Cornell University - Ithaca and Geneva, New York
 Finger Lakes Community College - Canandaigua and Geneva, New York
 Fresno State University - Fresno, California
 Grayson College - Grayson, Texas
 Kent State - Kent, Ohio
 Miami University - Oxford, Ohio
 Napa Valley College - Napa, California
 Oregon State University - Corvallis, Oregon
 Patrick & Henry Community College - Henry County, Virginia
 Paul Smith's College - Paul Smiths, New York
 Sonoma State University - Sonoma, California
 Surry Community College - Dobson, North Carolina
 University of California, Davis - Davis, California
 University of Missouri - Columbia, Missouri
 Virginia Polytechnic Institute and State University (Virginia Tech) - Blacksburg, Virginia
 Washington State University - Pullman, Washington
 Yavapai College - Clarkdale, Arizona

Prominent oenologists
 Alberto Antonini
 Miguel Brascó
 Cathy Corison
 Tullio De Rosa
 Peter Gago
 Emma Gao
 Hermann Jaeger
 Max Léglise
 Zelma Long
 Justin Meyer
 Hermann Müller (Thurgau)
 Ottavio Ottavi
 Jacques Puisais
 Michel Rolland
 Carol Shelton
 Păstorel Teodoreanu
 Miguel A. Torres
 Keith Wallace

References

External links

 Website of the Œnology and Viticulture department of the University of California at Davis
  Oenologist.com - online resource about wine and professionals in the wine industry 
  VinoEnology.com - online wine-making calculators and resource about wine and professionals in the wine industry
 Glossary of Terms for Enology, Viticulture and Winemaking, CCwinegroup.com, 2009 (PDF)